All About Love: New Visions is a book by bell hooks published in 2000 that discusses aspects of love in modern society. Hooks combines personal anecdotes as well as psychological and philosophical ideas to develop and strengthen her argument. She focuses on romantic love and believes that in American culture men have been socialized to mistrust the value and power of love while women have been socialized to be loving in most situations – even when their need to receive love goes unmet.

Each chapter discusses an aspect of love. First she explains her position and introduces an external work which is primarily about that aspect of love. Then she provides suggestions on how to reverse our cultural training and become more open to giving and receiving love. These aspects are affection, respect, recognition, commitment, trust, care, and open and honest communication - rather than the customary forms stemming from gender stereotypes, domination, control, ego and aggression.

Summary 

After many disputes with ex-boyfriends about the nature of love, hooks published All About Love: New Visions in 2000. She explains how her past two long-term boyfriends were foiled by "patriarchal thinking" and sexist gender roles, so neither relationship ever really had a chance. She kept wanting to recommend a book for the men to read, but could not find one that would clearly make her point. For this reason, she decided to write her own, which would go into depth about her true feelings towards love.
	
In this book, hooks combines her personal life experiences with philosophical and psychological ideas to shape her thesis and discuss her main concepts. She criticizes the way in which "love" is used in today's society: for example, we use the word without much meaning, when referring to how much we like or enjoy our favorite ice cream, color, or game. Hooks is very disturbed by the fact that our culture has lost the true meaning of love, and believes it is because we have no shared definition. For this reason, the first chapter of her book primarily focuses on what she thinks the definition of love is, which she explains includes components such as care, affection, trust, respect, honesty, communication, and commitment. She proposes that if we all came to the agreement that "love" is a verb rather than a noun, then we would all be happier. hooks believes love is more of an interactive process. It is not about what we just feel, but more about what we do. She states, "So many people think that it's enough to say what they feel, even if their actions do not correspond to what they are feeling". Bell hooks strongly clarifies why society needs to adopt a universal definition of love.

Hooks begins her book with a series of spiritual messages, including Bible verses, to support her definition of love. She claims that a standard definition of love must include spiritual growth for one's self and others. Although she refers to biblical messages, she does not promote religion; on the contrary, she encourages spiritual thinking. Hooks blames flaws in relationships nowadays on a loose understanding about love. She shares personal experiences about fearing rejection and emotional pain. As a result, she acknowledges lacking full commitment and expressing vulnerability because of the fear of not receiving those things in return, so giving care and affection were her minimal expectations in her relationships—necessary, but not sufficient. Hooks introduces the necessity of practicing self-love and care to sustain a healthy relationship with a concrete understanding of love.

Overall, this book sheds some light on what hooks sees as the modern day abandonment of love and what it means for people of today to experience love. One argument she proposes is that love cannot exist in the middle of a power struggle. Hooks goes as far as to present a number of problems she finds with our modern ideals of love and proposes possible solutions. She includes the propositions of full reconstruction and transformation of modern-day love based on "affection, respect, recognition, commitment, trust and care" (Nonfiction Book Review). Hooks also points out what she sees to be the roots of the problems regarding modern day love: gender stereotypes, domination, control, ego, and aggression (Nonfiction Book Review).

Hooks also discusses is the way, starting from a very young age, boys and girls are constantly being knocked down and told to fit into the tiny boxes of characteristics that are expected of them. hooks points out that the boy is denied his right to show, or even have, any true feelings. To further explain, she uses men in the American culture as an example, and describes how they have been socialized to mistrust the value and power of love, while the girl is taught that the most important thing she can do is change herself and her own feelings, with the hopes of attracting and pleasing everyone else. These unfair expectations lead boys and girls to grow up into men and women who are convinced that lies are the way to go, and no one should be showing their truest feelings to each other. This leads to the paradox hooks points out, because honesty is a natural requirement for a functional and healthy loving relationship. In hook's own words, "Lies may make people feel better, but they do not help them to know love".

Another central argument is that it is almost impossible for women to find happiness in what she sees as a brutal culture where men are taught to worry more about sexual satisfaction and performance than actually loving someone.  Paired with the fact that women are encouraged to focus so strongly on obtaining a partner, this leads to most relationships being completely one-sided: the men are emotionally satisfied, and the women are left without any true happiness. Hooks points out that despite these evident problems in modern-day love culture, love can be revived, and this is what she is arguing throughout her book.

Hooks wrote this book to inform the world how we can change the way we think about love, our culture, and one another. She teaches us ways to love in a face of a planet of love-lessness. Her New Visions demonstrate how love is possible, and stress that all love is important— romantic love, friendship, our love of strangers, and community.

References

2001 non-fiction books
Self-help books
Books by bell hooks